The Telefarm Towers is a transmission site for FM radio and television broadcasting in Shoreview, Minnesota consisting of two guyed towers.

The towers, called Shoreview Towers by local residents, are owned by Telefarm, Inc., a joint venture of Twin Cities broadcasters CBS Television Stations (WCCO channel 4), Hubbard Broadcasting (KSTP channel 5, KSTC channel 5.2, KSTP-FM 94.5 FM, and KTMY 107.1 FM), and Tegna (KARE channel 11) for the transmission of digital television and FM radio throughout the Greater Twin Cities. Along with Sinclair Broadcast Group's WUCW (channel 23), Minnesota Public Radio flagship station KNOW-FM (91.1 MHz) are additional tenants on the tower.

History 
The towers were built in the 1970s for analog television, and were replacements for a single "candelabra" style tower that collapsed prior to completion in 1971, killing six workers on the tower and one on the ground.

The towers were upgraded at the turn of the century to support digital TV transmitters to meet Federal Communications Commission requirements. Because each antenna assembly weighs many tons, the towers had to be strengthened. Work took longer than expected, and KSTP notably used its original broadcast tower along University Avenue in Saint Paul, Minnesota for digital transmission for about a year starting in late 1999 before construction was finished.

Digital television upgrades to the South facility were completed in 2000 and the North facility was finished in 2001.

During the summer of 2019, an antenna section on the north tower was removed. Television station KSTC moved to RF channel 30, from its previous channel of 45. This was due to the spectrum reallocation of the late 2010s. This move was completed by early September. On October 4, 2021, the new transmitter was installed on the north tower.

FM

Television

See also
KMSP Tower – another major tower in Shoreview
List of tallest structures

References

External links
  (Tower 1)
  (Tower 2)

Towers in Minnesota
Radio masts and towers in the United States
1970s establishments in Minnesota
Buildings and structures in Ramsey County, Minnesota